ERBB receptor feedback inhibitor 1 is a protein that in humans is encoded by the ERRFI1 gene.

MIG6 is a Cytoplasmic protein whose expression is upregulated with cell growth (Wick et al., 1995). It shares significant homology with the protein product of rat gene-33, which is induced during cell stress and mediates cell signaling (Makkinje et al., 2000; Fiorentino et al., 2000).

Interactions 

ERRFI1 has been shown to interact with Stratifin and CDC42.

References

Further reading

External links